Guran Sarab (also Romanized as Gūrān Sarāb and Gowrānsarāb; also known as Kuransura and Kyuransura) is a village in Khanandabil-e Sharqi Rural District, in the Central District of Khalkhal County, Ardabil Province, Iran. At the 2006 census, its population was 947, in 198 families.

References 

Tageo

Towns and villages in Khalkhal County